Coo Coo may refer to:

Film
 Princess Coo-Coo, a character in the 1977 John Waters film Desperate Living

Literature
 Coo Coo Comics, a comic book published by Nedor Comics

Music

 "Coo Coo", a 1922 song by Al Jolson
 "Coo Coo", a single by Big Brother & the Holding Company from their album Big Brother & the Holding Company
 "Coo Coo", a song from the 1959 musical Little Mary Sunshine
 Coo Coo, an Italo disco group
 Coo Coo Cal, American rapper

Other
 Coo Coo Marlin, American racecar driver, father of Sterling Marlin
 Coo-coo, or cou-cou, a Barbadian dish, often made from corn meal and okra

See also
 KooKoo, an album by Debbie Harry
 Koo-Koo the Bird Girl, an American entertainer
 Cuckoo (disambiguation)